Lost Channel, Ontario can refer to:

Lost Channel, Hastings County, Ontario
Lost Channel, Parry Sound District, Ontario